"Leave It Up to Me" is a song by Aaron Carter taken from his third studio album Oh Aaron. It served as the lead single from Paramount/Nickelodeon's Jimmy Neutron: Boy Genius soundtrack. Carter performed two other songs along with this on the soundtrack, "A.C.'s Alien Nation" and "Go Jimmy Jimmy."

Music video
The music video opens with Carter in a boring tour of a space museum. As the tour guide instructs him and the rest of his classmates to move onwards, Carter stumbles near a door to a restricted area. He enters it as his clothes morph into a futuristic outfit. Throughout the video, Carter sits in a chair near a control console and a stellar map that shows him singing. Among the buttons on the console is one that turns him CGI while singing with a group of men in black. While performing the song, Carter glances over near the screen, only to realize it's displaying a countdown warning about it self-destructing. Carter jumps and aborts it just in time, as the picture zooms out to black.

An alternate version of the music video was featured on the VHS and DVD release of Jimmy Neutron: Boy Genius, where film clips are shown on the control screen instead of Carter singing. At the very end, instead of the picture zooming out, an explosion is shown with Jimmy on his rocket zooming by.

Charts

References

2002 singles
Aaron Carter songs
Jive Records singles
Songs written for animated films
Songs written for films
2002 songs
Songs written by Lucas Secon
The Adventures of Jimmy Neutron, Boy Genius